Walter Raymond Radzick (May 25, 1935 – March 31, 2005) was an award-winning defensive tackle who played in the Canadian Football League from 1958 to 1965.

A graduate of the University of Toronto, Radzick first played football with the Toronto Balmy Beach Beachers of the Ontario Rugby Football Union. In 1958 he signed with the Calgary Stampeders where he won the Dr. Beattie Martin Trophy for best Canadian rookie in the west (with 1 interception and 2 fumble recoveries.) In 1960 he returned to Toronto, starting 5 seasons with the Argonauts; 66 regular season games and 5 playoff games. He finished his career playing 6 games with the Hamilton Tiger-Cats in 1965 (the year they won the Grey Cup.) As an Argonaut, Radzick missed only one game from 1961 to 1964.
He died in 2005 in Toronto at the age of 69.

References

1935 births
Calgary Stampeders players
Toronto Argonauts players
Hamilton Tiger-Cats players
2005 deaths
Canadian Football League Rookie of the Year Award winners
Canadian football defensive linemen
Ontario Rugby Football Union players
Toronto Balmy Beach Beachers players
Players of Canadian football from Manitoba
People from Saint Boniface, Winnipeg
Canadian football people from Winnipeg